New Jersey's 22nd Legislative District is one of 40 in the New Jersey Legislature. As of the 2011 apportionment, the district includes the Middlesex County municipalities of Dunellen and Middlesex; the Somerset County localities of Green Brook Township and North Plainfield; and the Union County municipalities of Clark, Fanwood, Linden, Plainfield, Rahway, Scotch Plains and Winfield Township.

Demographic characteristics
As of the 2020 United States census, the district had a population of 229,951, of whom 176,697 (76.8%) were of voting age. The racial makeup of the district was 91,410 (39.8%) White, 50,902 (22.1%) African American, 1,961 (0.9%) Native American, 12,140 (5.3%) Asian, 87 (0.0%) Pacific Islander, 45,390 (19.7%) from some other race, and 28,061 (12.2%) from two or more races. Hispanic or Latino of any race were 78,068 (33.9%) of the population. 

The 22nd District had 146,052 registered voters as of December 1, 2021, of whom 48,780 (33.4%) were registered as unaffiliated, 72,133 (49.4%) were registered as Democrats, 23,134 (15.8%) were registered as Republicans, and 2,005 (1.4%) were registered to other parties.

The district had the eighth-highest percentage of African American residents of all 40 districts statewide. The municipal tax rate was 11th highest and school taxes were 12th highest leading to one of the highest overall tax rates, after including rebates, which was the 7th highest in the state. Registered Democrats outnumbered Republicans by a 5-2 margin.

Political representation
For the 2022–2023 session, the 22nd Legislative District of the New Jersey Legislature is represented in the State Senate by Nicholas Scutari (D, Linden) and in the General Assembly by Linda S. Carter (D, Plainfield) and James J. Kennedy (D, Rahway).

The legislative district overlaps with New Jersey's 7th, 10th and 12th congressional districts.

Apportionment history
When the 40-district legislative map was created in 1973, the 22nd district had an unusual shape as it weaved its way through the parts of Union County not covered by the 20th, 21st, and 25th districts. The center of the 1973 district was Scotch Plains and included spurs to Kenilworth, Chatham Township in Morris County via Berkeley Heights, Plainfield, and Rahway. Following the 1981 redistricting, the district became more straightforward with fewer prongs running from Winfield Township and comprising the remainder of western Union County (except Plainfield) and into western Essex County up to Caldwell with a spur to Maplewood. The 1991 district created in that year's redistricting became much more compact, comprising western Union County (again excluding Plainfield) but heading into Middlesex County's Dunellen, Morris County's Chatham Township and Passaic Township (renamed Long Hill Township in 1992) and Somerset County's Green Brook, North Plainfield, Warren Township, and Watchung.

Facing challenges from the Democrats, the team of Peter McDonough in the Senate and Donald DiFrancesco and William J. Maguire in the Assembly won re-election in 1977. McDonough resigned from the Senate in 1979; DiFrancesco won the Senate seat in a special election in November 1979 while Bob Franks and Maguire won election in the Assembly that year.

In redistricting following the 1990 United States Census, Maureen Ogden was switched to the 21st District, where she won election to the Assembly, and Richard Bagger won the now-vacant ballot spot in the 22nd District.

Changes to the district made as part of the redistricting in 2001, based on the results of the 2000 United States Census added Middlesex Borough and Plainfield City (from the 17th Legislative District), Rahway City (from the 20th District) and Linden City (from the 21st District) and removed Berkeley Heights Township, Chatham Township, Cranford, Garwood, Long Hill Township, Mountainside Borough, New Providence Borough, Warren Township, Watchung, and Westfield Town (to the 21st Legislative District). Changes made as part of the New Jersey Legislative apportionment in 2011 left the municipalities in the district unchanged.

Alan Augustine left office as of March 31, 2001, just several weeks before his death, due to health problems, and was succeeded by Thomas Kean Jr. As of January 21, 2001, DiFrancesco became the 51st Governor of New Jersey after Christine Todd Whitman left office to become Administrator of the Environmental Protection Agency, with DiFrancesco simultaneously holding his post as Senate President. In the 2001 redistricting following the 2000 United States Census, several of the suburban, Republican-leaning municipalities in the district were replaced by Linden, Plainfield and Rahway, which gave the district a distinct Democratic tilt. DiFrancesco retired from the Legislature, Bagger and Kean were relocated to the 21st District, and the three legislative seats under District 22 were taken by Democrats Joseph Suliga in the Senate and Jerry Green (who previously represented District 17) and Linda Stender in the Assembly.

Suliga did not run for re-election in 2003 after a scandal involving his alleged drunken sexual harassment of a woman in Atlantic City, New Jersey. He dropped out and entered rehabilitation for alcoholism and was replaced on the ballot and in the Senate by fellow Linden Democrat Nicholas Scutari.

Due to a scandal involving her husband applying for help from Habitat for Humanity to aid in rebuilding their house on the Jersey Shore, Stender did not run for re-election in 2015. Union County Democratic officials endorsed former Rahway Mayor James J. Kennedy over Fanwood Mayor Colleen Mahr as the successor; Green and Kennedy went on to win in the general election.

Scutari, Green, and Kennedy were all re-elected in 2017, although Green did not attend any of the following legislative session due to a long illness. He died on April 18, 2018. Democratic committee members in Middlesex, Somerset, and Union Counties selected Union County Freeholder Linda S. Carter as his replacement on May 19; she took her Assembly seat on May 24.

Election history

Election results

Senate

General Assembly

References

Middlesex County, New Jersey
Somerset County, New Jersey
Union County, New Jersey
22